Gangster Capitalism is an American podcast hosted by Andrew Jenks. The first season focused on the 2019 college admissions bribery scandal. Season two focuses on the National Rifle Association. Season three focuses on Jerry Falwell Jr. and Liberty University. It is the first podcast produced as part of Cadence13's C13Originals.

During season one, Jenks and actors read portions of the FBI affidavit, including transcripts of phone calls between Rick Singer and his clients involved in the college admissions scandal. Levitt stated that the goal of the podcast was to shed light on the larger societal problem that the admissions scandal reflected. In September 2019, the season one was optioned as a television project with Entertainment 360, with the script written by Margaret Nagle.

Episodes

See also
List of American crime podcasts
Political podcast

References

External links
 

2019 podcast debuts
Infotainment
Audio podcasts
Political podcasts
Documentary podcasts